The Victorian Premier's Literary Awards were created by the Victorian Government with the aim of raising the profile of contemporary creative writing and Australia's publishing industry. As of 2013, it is reportedly Australia's richest literary prize with the top winner receiving 125,000 and category winners 25,000 each.

The awards were established in 1985 by John Cain, Premier of Victoria, to mark the centenary of the births of Vance and Nettie Palmer, two of Australia's best-known writers and critics who made significant contributions to Victorian and Australian literary culture.

From 1986 till 1997, the awards were presented as part of the Melbourne Writers Festival. In 1997 their administration was transferred to the State Library of Victoria.  By 2004, the total prize money was 180,000. In 2011, stewardship was taken over by the Wheeler Centre.

Winners 2011–present
Beginning in 2011, the awards were restructured into 5 categories: Fiction, Nonfiction, Poetry, Drama and Young People's. The winner of each receives $25,000. Of those 5 winners, one is chosen as the overall winner of the Victorian Prize for Literature and receives an additional $100,000. There are two other categories with different prize amounts: an honorary People's Choice Award voted on by readers, and an Unpublished Manuscript Award with a prize amount of $15,000. In 2022 an Award for Children's Literature valued at $25,000 was added, with entries being accepted in 2023.

Shortlists are maintained in the main article for each category.

Victorian Prize for Literature

Fiction
For winners from 1985 to 2010, see Vance Palmer Prize for Fiction.

Nonfiction
For winners from 1985 to 2010, see the Nettie Palmer Prize for Non-fiction.

Poetry
For winners from 1985 to 2010, see the C. J. Dennis Prize for Poetry.

Writing for Young Adults
For winners from 1985 to 2010, see the Victorian Premier's Prize for Young Adult Fiction.

Drama
For winners from 1985 to 2010, see the Louis Esson Prize for Drama.

People's Choice Award

Victorian Premier's Unpublished Manuscript Award
For winners from 2003 to 2010, see the main article. No award was presented in 2011.

Prize for Indigenous Writing

Defunct award categories (1985–2010) 
From 1985 to 2010 prizes were offered in some or all of the below categories.

Vance Palmer Prize for Fiction
Nettie Palmer Prize for Non-fiction
Prize for Young Adult Fiction
C. J. Dennis Prize for Poetry
Louis Esson Prize for Drama
Alfred Deakin Prize for an Essay Advancing Public Debate
Prize for Science Writing (biennial)
Village Roadshow Prize for Screen Writing
Grollo Ruzzene Foundation Prize for Writing about Italians in Australia
John Curtin Prize for Journalism
Prize for Best Music Theatre Script
Prize for Indigenous Writing (Biennial)
Prize for a First Book of History (Biennial)
Dinny O'Hearn Prize for Literary Translation (Triennial)
A.A. Phillips Prize for Australian Studies
Alan Marshall Prize for Children's Literature
Prize for First Fiction

See also 
Victorian Community History Awards
Wheeler Centre

Notes

External links
State Library of Victoria

 
Australian literary awards
Australian non-fiction book awards
Australian history awards
Awards established in 1985
1985 establishments in Australia